Karina Baluyut is an artist from the Philippines. Her paintings are expressionist in nature. Her abstract work is defined by color fields, organic patterns and "bold brushwork."

Baluyut is among the original members of the Guevarra Group of Artists from its inception, and one of the first to have exhibited their works at Galerie Joaquin.

Life
She graduated from the University of the Philippines.

Given her formal training as an architect, Baluyut has incorporated the tenets of the discipline in her work as a painter in the abstract expressionist genre. Baluyut's works are highly distinctive for their sparing but eloquent evocations of key architectural concepts and principles. These abstractions often conjure themes of reflection and contemplation. Her influences are Mark Rothko, Paul Klee and other progenitors of the Color Field painting.

Baluyut is a veteran of countless group shows, mostly at the Galerie Joaquin, where her abstract works are among the favorites of collectors. 
Her one-woman show was titled “Fields of Gold”. She was one of the artists selected to be shown in Galerie Raphael's first exhibit.

References

External links
 http://www.baluyut.com

Expressionist painters
Filipino artists
Filipino women artists
Living people
University of the Philippines alumni
20th-century women artists
Year of birth missing (living people)